Rhyzodiastes bifossulatus is a species of ground beetle in the subfamily Rhysodinae. It was described by Antoine Henri Grouvelle in 1903. It is found in Borneo, with confirmed records from Sabah (Malaysia).

References

Rhyzodiastes
Beetles of Asia
Insects of Malaysia
Invertebrates of Borneo
Beetles described in 1903